The 1991–92 season was Colchester United's 50th season in their history and their second consecutive season in the Conference, the fifth tier of English football and the highest tier of non-League football in England. Alongside competing in the Conference, the club also participated in the FA Cup, the FA Trophy and the Bob Lord Trophy.

Manager Ian Atkins left for a coaching role at Birmingham City in the summer after narrowly missing out on the Conference title the previous campaign. Experienced forward Roy McDonough was appointed the club's new player-manager tasked with taking Colchester United back to the Football League. Both Colchester and Wycombe Wanderers ended the season on 94 points, with the U's promoted on superior goal difference.

In the FA Cup, Colchester went out in the first round to Exeter City, while McDonough fielded a weakened side in the Bob Lord Trophy, crashing out 6–2 to league rivals Wycombe. However, in the FA Trophy, following two replay wins in the first two rounds of the competition, the U's reached the Wembley final, where they faced Witton Albion, who had dumped them out at the quarter-final stage the previous season. Colchester won the match 3–1 to complete a non-League double.

Season overview
Following Ian Atkins decision to return to Birmingham City in a coaching capacity, new chairman James Bowdidge appointed Roy McDonough in a player-manager role. Having been Atkins' assistant, McDonough promised to abandon Atkins' sweeper system and to instead promote a more attacking formula.

McDonough himself equalled a club record by scoring four goals in a game at Slough Town in August. On 28 September 1991, in Colchester's top-of-the-table clash against rivals Wycombe Wanderers at Adams Park, Scott Barrett became the first Colchester goalkeeper to score from open play. His long upfield goal kick in the 90th minute of the game bounced over Wycombe goalkeeper Paul Hyde and sealed what would prove to be a vital 2–1 win.

In November, the U's became the first team to be knocked out of the FA Cup without conceding a goal. After seeing off Burton Albion 5–0 in the fourth qualifying round, they twice drew 0–0 with Exeter City in the first round and following replay, only to lose on penalties.

As 1992 dawned, Colchester found themselves seven points ahead of nearest rivals Wycombe in the league, but 16 home wins in succession failed to shake off their Buckinghamshire counterparts. A poor 4–1 defeat at Welling United and a lackadaisical 4–4 draw at Macclesfield Town threatened to derail the U's attempts to reach the Football League.

Meanwhile, Colchester were focused on their FA Trophy cup run. Kingstonian and Merthyr Tydfil were dispatched in replays following a 2–2 and 0–0 draw respectively. The U's then saw off Morecambe and Telford United convincingly, and then a 4–1 aggregate win over Macclesfield in the semi-final. They progressed to the Wembley final, with the tie to be played after the final fixture of the Conference season.

Going into the last game of the season, it was evident McDonough had delivered on his promise of attacking football. The U's found themselves level on points with Wycombe, but crucially carried an eight-goal advantage. United beat already relegated Barrow 5–0 at Layer Road with a Mike Masters hat-trick sealing the Conference championship. McDonough had scored 29 goals, with 26 for Steve McGavin and 18 for Gary Bennett, with a total of 98 league goals achieved.

A week after the promotion celebrations at Layer Road, a crowd of 32,254 witnessed Colchester United in their first-ever Wembley appearance. A famous non-League double was achieved as they gained revenge over Witton Albion, who had dumped the U's out of the competition last campaign. Colchester won 3–1 courtesy of goals from Mike Masters, Steve McGavin and Nicky Smith. Thousands of fans packed Colchester High Street a few days later as the U's team paraded their trophies around the town.

Players

Transfers

In

 Total spending:  ~ £750

Out

 Total incoming:  ~ £15,000

Loans in

Loans out

Match details

Conference

League table

Results round by round

Matches

Bob Lord Trophy

FA Cup

FA Trophy

Squad statistics

Appearances and goals

|-
!colspan="14"|Players who appeared for Colchester who left during the season

|}

Goalscorers

Disciplinary record

Clean sheets
Number of games goalkeepers kept a clean sheet.

Player debuts
Players making their first-team Colchester United debut in a fully competitive match.

See also
List of Colchester United F.C. seasons

References

General
Books

Specific

1991-92
English football clubs 1991–92 season